Shem (Šēm)  was one of the sons of Noah in the Bible (Genesis 5-11 and 1 Chronicles 1:4) and the Quran. 

The children of Shem were Elam, Ashur, Arphaxad, Lud and Aram, in addition to unnamed daughters. Abraham, the patriarch of Jews, Christians, and Muslims, was one of the descendants of Arphaxad.

In medieval and early modern European tradition he was considered to be the ancestor of the peoples of Asia, and he gives his name to the title "Semites" formerly given to West Asian peoples.

Islamic literature describes Shem as one of the believing sons of Noah. Some sources even identify Shem as a prophet in his own right and that he was the next prophet after his father.

In the Bible

Genesis 10
Genesis 10:21 refers to relative ages of Shem and his brother Japheth, but with sufficient ambiguity to have yielded different English translations. The verse is translated in the King James Version as: "Unto Shem also, the father of all the children of Eber, the brother of Japheth the elder, even to him were children born." However, the New American Standard Bible gives: "Also to Shem, the father of all the children of Eber, and the older brother of Japheth, children were born".

According to Genesis 10:22-31 (Jewish Publication Society translation of 1917):
22 The sons of Shem: Elam, and Asshur, and Arpachshad, and Lud, and Aram. 23 And the sons of Aram: Uz, and Hul, and Gether, and Mash. 24 And Arpachshad begot Shelah; and Shelah begot Eber. 25 And unto Eber were born two sons; the name of the one was Peleg; for in his days was the earth divided; and his brother's name was Joktan. 26 And Joktan begot Almodad, and Sheleph, and Hazarmaveth, and Jerah; 27 and Hadoram, and Uzal, and Diklah; 28 and Obal, and Abimael, and Sheba; 29 and Ophir, and Havilah, and Jobab; all these were the sons of Joktan. 30 And their dwelling was from Mesha, as thou goest toward Sephar, unto the mountain of the east. 31 These are the sons of Shem, after their families, after their tongues, in their lands, after their nations. 32 These are the families of the sons of Noah, after their generations, in their nations; and of these were the nations divided in the earth after the flood.

Genesis 11
Genesis 11:10 records that Shem was 100 years old at the birth of Arphaxad, two years after the flood; and that he lived for another 500 years after this, making his age at death 600 years.

Excerpts from Genesis 11:10-27— (Jewish Publication Society translation of 1917):
'Shem was a hundred years old, and begot Arpachshad two years after the flood. ... Arpachshad lived five and thirty years, and begot Shelah. 13 And Arpachshad lived after he begot Shelah ... Shelah lived thirty years, and begot Eber. ... Eber lived four and thirty years, and begot Peleg. ... Peleg lived thirty years, and begot Reu. ... Reu lived two and thirty years, and begot Serug. '... Serug lived thirty years, and begot Nahor. ... Nahor lived nine and twenty years, and begot Terah. ... Terah lived seventy years, and begot Abram, Nahor, and Haran. ... and Haran begot Lot.

In later Jewish sources 
The 1st-century historian Flavius Josephus told a legendary, non-scriptural account that Shem's five sons were the progenitors of the nations of Elam, Assyria, Chaldea, Lydia, and Levantine, respectively.

According to some Jewish traditions (e.g., B. Talmud Nedarim 32b; Genesis Rabbah 46:7; Genesis Rabbah 56:10; Leviticus Rabbah 25:6; Numbers Rabbah 4:8.), Shem is believed to have been Melchizedek, King of Salem, whom Abraham is recorded to have met after the Battle of the Four Kings.

A rabbinic document that surfaced in the 17th century, claiming to be the lost Book of Jasher, provides some names not found in any other source.

In Islam

Sunni Islam
Shem is regarded by scholars to be the successor to Noah, receiving prophetic knowledge, enlightenment, and leadership of his people. Shem was also one of the people whom God had Jesus resurrect as a sign to the Children of Israel.
Early Islamic historians like Ibn Ishaq and Ibn Hisham always included Shem's name in the genealogy of Muhammad.

Shi'a Islam
In a Shiite tradition Imam Ja'far al-Sadiq has narrated to his companions that Jibrael visited Noah close to the time of his death, relaying God's message: "Oh Noah! Your prophethood has expired and your days are complete, so look to the Great Name, the inheritance and effects of the knowledge of prophethood, and hand these over to your son, Sam (Shem), for I do not leave the Earth except that there is a knowledgeable one by which obedience to Me (God) can be recognized..."

In Gnosticism
The Paraphrase of Shem, which contains ideas unique to other Gnostic scriptures, states that Shem was the first being on Earth. Unlike traditional Sethian literature, Seth is not seen as the father of the followers of Gnosticism, rather it is Shem, who receives a divine revelation from a spiritual savior named Derkedeas. Shem later helps bring his universal teaching of secret knowledge to humanity before the forces of darkness attempt to destroy the world with a great flood.

In Mandaeism

According to Mandaean beliefs and scriptures, Shem is cognate with the angelic soteriological figure Sam Ziwa. Shem is considered the progenitor of the Mandaeans and a prophet.

Family tree

The following family tree contains information from the Hebrew Bible, without data from any other sources.

In popular culture

See also
 Wives aboard the Ark

Notes

References

Bibliography

External links

 

 
Bereshit (parashah)
Bible genealogy
Book of Genesis people
Children of Noah
Noach (parashah)
Uthras
Hebrew Bible people in Mandaeism
Legendary progenitors